Eileen is a 2015 novel by Ottessa Moshfegh, published by Penguin Press. It is Moshfegh's first novel. It was shortlisted for the 2016 Man Booker Prize in September of that year.

Premise
The story concerns an unhappy 24-year-old woman named Eileen who works as a secretary at a prison, and what happens to her during a bitter Massachusetts winter in 1964.

Characters
Eileen Dunlop
Eileen's father
Rebecca, a co-worker of Eileen's
Joanie, Eileen's sister
Lee Polk, a boy in the prison where Eileen works

Reception
Overall, the novel received mostly positive reviews. Writing for The New York Times, Lily King notes how, "Moshfegh writes beautiful sentences. One after the other they unwind — playful, shocking, wise, morbid, witty, searingly sharp. The beginning of this novel is so impressive, so controlled yet whimsical, fresh and thrilling, you feel she can do anything." Similarly, Jean Zimmerman of NPR praised the author, writing, "Charmingly disturbing. Delightfully dour. Pleasingly perverse. These are some of the oxymorons that ran through my mind as I read Eileen, Ottessa Moshfegh's intense, flavorful, remarkable new novel."

Moshfegh won the 2016 Hemingway Foundation/PEN Award.

Film adaptation
A film adaptation was released in January 2023, directed by William Oldroyd and starring Thomasin McKenzie and Anne Hathaway. Filming began in New Jersey in early 2022.

Awards 
2016 Man Booker Prize, shortlistee.
 2016 Hemingway Foundation/PEN Award

References

2015 American novels
Novels by Ottessa Moshfegh
American thriller novels
Hemingway Foundation/PEN Award-winning works
Novels set in Massachusetts
2015 debut novels
First-person narrative novels
Fiction set in 1964
Penguin Press books